Palaeobenthesicymus is an extinct genus of prawns which existed in what is now Lebanon in the Late Santonian. It was described by Denis Audo and Sylvain Charbonnier in 2013, as a new genus for the species Penaeus libanensis, first described by P. Brocchi in 1875.

References

Dendrobranchiata
Late Cretaceous crustaceans
Monotypic arthropod genera
Cretaceous Lebanon
Fossils of Lebanon
Late Cretaceous arthropods of Asia
Santonian genera